Elachista lastrella is a moth of the family Elachistidae. It is found from Germany to Spain.

The larvae feed on Bromus erectus. They mine the leaves of their host plant. The mine has the form of a long slender corridor at the underside of the lower leaves. Most mines ascend from the base of the leaf to the tip. The frass is deposited in a narrow continuous line. A single may make two to three mines. Only the final mine is full depth. They are yellowish with a brownish head. Larvae can be found in early spring.

References

lastrella
Moths described in 1896
Moths of Europe